Jagannadapuram is near to Parvatipuram town in Vizianagaram district of Andhra Pradesh, India.

Villages in Vizianagaram district